Tai Viet is a Unicode block containing characters for writing several of the Tai languages: Tai Dam, Tai Dón, and Thai Song.

History
The following Unicode-related documents record the purpose and process of defining specific characters in the Tai Viet block:

References 

Unicode blocks